Pedana mandal is one of the 25 mandals in Krishna district of the Indian state of Andhra Pradesh. It is under the administration of Machilipatnam revenue division and the headquarters are located at Pedana. The mandal is bounded by Gudlavalleru, Mudinepalle, Bantumilli, Gudur and Machilipatnam mandals.

Towns and villages 

 census, the mandal has 31 settlements. It includes 1 town and 30 villages in the mandal.

The settlements in the mandal are listed below:

Note: M-Municipality

See also 
List of villages in Krishna district

References 

Mandals in Krishna district